Pointis-Inard is a commune in the Haute-Garonne department in southwestern France.

Geography
The commune is bordered by eight other communes: Estancarbon to the north, Labarthe-Inard to the northeast, Montespan to the east, Ganties to the southeast, Soueich to the south, Lespiteau to southwest, Rieucazé to the west, and finally by Miramont-de-Comminges to the northwest.

Population

See also
Communes of the Haute-Garonne department

References

Communes of Haute-Garonne